Carlos Alberto Rodrigues Gavião (born February 2, 1980), known as just Gavião, is a Brazilian football player.

Club statistics

References

External links

1980 births
Living people
Brazilian footballers
J1 League players
Santos FC players
Criciúma Esporte Clube players
Júbilo Iwata players
Vila Nova Futebol Clube players
Duque de Caxias Futebol Clube players
Brazilian expatriate footballers
Expatriate footballers in Japan
Association football midfielders